Vivek Kajaria, (born 1 October 1984) is an Indian film producer and director. He is the founder/managing director of Holy Basil Productions Pvt. Ltd. and Co- founder/partner of NAHB, a joint venture between Holy Basil Productions and Navalakha Arts.

Early life and education
Vivek Kajaria finished his education from Warwick University, UK in M.Sc. in Computer Science and Applications. Prior to this, he already held a degree in MBA. Later, he joined his family business of construction and development to polish himself as a skillful entrepreneur and then went after his longtime dream to be associated with the creative and media industry by finding his very own brand, Holy Basil Productions.

Career 
Having successfully worked along with some of the most reputed agencies like LOWE LINTAS, TBWA, Publicis Singapore, Leo Burnette and on brands like Standard Chartered, Surf Excel, Hamam, HUL, Complan, Transtadia, etc. Vivek made the long due foray into Feature films by a leap of collaboration.

NAVALAKHA ARTS & HOLY BASIL PRODUCTIONS came into existence through the collaboration of two ambitious companies and in a very short time made its mark with an enviable track record of making feature films like Shala (film) (won National award – Best film), Anumati (film) (Presenter),  Fandry (won a number of national and international awards and is still counting), Chaurya and Siddhant.

Vivek turned Director with his debut short, Durga, which bagged him the special mention Dada Saheb Phalke award and has travelled to over 20 film festivals across the globe.

His upcoming films include Raju (Kannada), which is the story of thousands of Raju's in our villages who are very intelligent but remain so without exposure and appreciation. The film has Music given by Shri Illiyaraja.

His feature films in Marathi have been awarded by national and international body of film makers and Festivals across the globe. Now he is also entering Bollywood industry by working on a Hindi feature film and also presenting one.

He has also played an active role in fund raising activities for Mumbai Film Festival.

Very recently he has founded another company called Basil Content Media Pvt Ltd. The company was founded with the idea of being one of India's first film sales and film festival strategies outfits. It operates with the ideology that a crosshatched and sustainable ecosystem needs to be maintained to be able to create value for all stakeholders in the filmed entertainment value chain.

Filmography

 Fandry (2013) 
Anumati (2013)
 Siddhant
Chaurya
Durga (Short film)
Rakshas (2018)

References

External links
 
Vivek Kajaria on Twitter

1984 births
Living people
Film producers from Mumbai
Marathi cinema